Abd al-Aziz ibn Mansur was the ruler of the Hammadids from 1104 to 1121.

Biography 
Abd al-Aziz succeeded his brother Badis in 1105. Badis had dismissed his brother from his governorship of Algiers and was relegated to Jijel. Abd al-Aziz returns from Jijel to Bejaia to exercise power.

Abd Al-Aziz married a daughter of Makhoukh, a famous chief of Beni-Ouamannou (a zenata tribe). A marriage that has renewed peace with the Beni-Ouamannou.

References 

Hammadids
1121 deaths
Year of birth unknown
12th-century rulers in Africa
12th-century Berber people
Berber rulers